Yoshiyuki Takayama is a Japanese mixed martial artist.

Mixed martial arts record

|-
| Draw
| align=center| 3-3-2
| Mamoru Okochi
| Draw
| Shooto: Gateway to the Extremes
| 
| align=center| 2
| align=center| 5:00
| Setagaya, Tokyo, Japan
| 
|-
| Loss
| align=center| 3-3-1
| Hiroyuki Abe
| Decision (unanimous)
| Shooto: 10th Anniversary Event
| 
| align=center| 2
| align=center| 5:00
| Yokohama, Kanagawa, Japan
| 
|-
| Draw
| align=center| 3-2-1
| Mamoru Okochi
| Draw
| Shooto: Shooter's Dream
| 
| align=center| 2
| align=center| 5:00
| Setagaya, Tokyo, Japan
| 
|-
| Win
| align=center| 3-2
| Yoshihiro Fujita
| Decision (majority)
| Shooto: Gig '98 2nd
| 
| align=center| 2
| align=center| 5:00
| Tokyo, Japan
| 
|-
| Win
| align=center| 2-2
| Katsuhisa Akasaki
| Submission (rear naked choke)
| Shooto: Gig '98 1st
| 
| align=center| 1
| align=center| 3:34
| Tokyo, Japan
| 
|-
| Loss
| align=center| 1-2
| Masahiro Oishi
| Decision (unanimous)
| Shooto: Gig
| 
| align=center| 2
| align=center| 5:00
| Tokyo, Japan
| 
|-
| Win
| align=center| 1-1
| Ed Wedding
| Decision (unanimous)
| Shooto: Reconquista 1
| 
| align=center| 3
| align=center| 3:00
| Tokyo, Japan
| 
|-
| Loss
| align=center| 0-1
| Hisao Ikeda
| Submission (kimura)
| Shooto: Vale Tudo Junction 1
| 
| align=center| 3
| align=center| 2:57
| Tokyo, Japan
|

See also
List of male mixed martial artists

References

External links
 
 Yoshiyuki Takayama at mixedmartialarts.com

Japanese male mixed martial artists
Living people
Year of birth missing (living people)